The Act to Prevent Pollution from Ships (APPS, 33 U.S.C. §§1905-1915) is a United States law that implements the provisions of MARPOL and the annexes to which the United States is a party. The most recent U.S. action concerning MARPOL occurred in April 2006, when the U.S. Senate approved Annex VI, which regulates air pollution (Treaty Doc. 108–7, Exec. Rept. 109-13). Following that approval, in March 2007, the House of Representatives approved legislation to implement the standards in Annex VI (H.R. 802), through regulations to be promulgated by Environmental Protection Agency in consultation with the U.S. Coast Guard.

APPS applies to all U.S.-flagged ships anywhere in the world and to all foreign-flagged vessels operating in navigable waters of the United States or while at port under U.S. jurisdiction. The Coast Guard has primary responsibility to prescribe and enforce regulations necessary to implement APPS in these waters. The regulatory mechanism established in APPS to implement MARPOL is separate and distinct from the Clean Water Act and other federal environmental laws.

The H.R. 6665 legislation was passed by the 96th U.S. Congressional session and signed by U.S. President Jimmy Carter on October 21, 1980.

See also
 Clean Water Act
 Merchant Marine Act of 1920
 Merchant Shipping (Pollution) Act 2006
 Regulation of ship pollution in the United States

References

 This article is based on a public domain Congressional Research Service report: Copeland, Claudia. "Cruise Ship Pollution: Background, Laws and Regulations, and Key Issues" (Order Code RL32450). Congressional Research Service (Updated February 6, 2008).

External links
 The Act online
 
 
 

1980 in law
96th United States Congress
Pollution in the United States
United States federal environmental legislation
Environmental impact of shipping
Ocean pollution